Douglas County Search and Rescue is an all-volunteer organization in Douglas County within Douglas County Sheriff's Office.  With approximately sixty active members year-round, Douglas County's Search and Rescue (Douglas SAR) responds to searches for missing children and adults, evidence and other search requests in the county and on mutual aid calls anywhere in the state of Colorado.  Douglas SAR is a mountain rescue Type I certified team able to handle the toughest terrain and remain out in the field without resupply for extended periods.

History

Today the team, headquartered in Castle Rock, CO at 13S 511170 4362088 UTM, trains and is equipped to respond to sustained wilderness and high altitude searches, missing children searches, mass casualty incidents or natural disasters as well as Urban Search and Rescue (US&R) with some members also members of regional US&R task force and swiftwater rescue.

Douglas SAR recruits new members once a year and no prior MRA or SAR experience is required.

Operations 
Due to the diverse geography of Douglas County, its proximity to major population centers, and natural tourist attractions, Douglas County's SAR team operates closely with multiple local, state and federal agencies.  Based on request and activation by Colorado Search and Rescue Association (CRSB), responsible for mutual-aid coordinations within the State, the team will deploy anywhere, anytime in support of missions within other counties.

Resources 
Douglas SAR has the ability to field two command vehicles, two rescue vehicles, a drone truck designed for self-sustained UAV operations, plus multiple ATVs, trailers, and snowmobiles.

See also
Mountain Rescue
Mountain Rescue Association
Search and Rescue
Wilderness First Aid
Wilderness First Responder (WFR)
Wilderness Emergency Medical Technician (WEMT)

References

External links
Douglas County's Search & Rescue website
Douglas County Sheriff’s site
DCSARCO helping stranded motorists
DCSARCO training for MCI
DCSARCO's UAV helped to find missing hikers
DCSARCO finds missing hikers in Pike's National Forest
Five busiest SAR/MRA teams in Colorado
Rocky Mountain Region of the MRA member organizations
CRSB

Rescue
Rescue agencies
Organizations based in Colorado
Non-profit organizations based in the San Francisco Bay Area
Mountain rescue agencies